Saint-Usage may refer to the following places in France:

Saint-Usage, Aube, a commune in the department of Aube
Saint-Usage, Côte-d'Or, a commune in the department of Côte-d'Or